Events in the year 1966 in Turkey.

Parliament
 13th Parliament of Turkey

Incumbents
President
Cemal Gürsel (up to 28 March)
Cevdet Sunay (from 28 March)
Prime Minister – Süleyman Demirel
Leader of the opposition – İsmet İnönü

Ruling party and the main opposition
  Ruling party – Justice Party (AP)
  Main opposition – Republican People's Party (CHP)

Cabinet
30th government of Turkey

Events
3 January – First pipeline of Turkey between Batman and İskenderun
26 March – A report by a medical board stating that the president Cemal Gürsel, a victim of paralysis was unable to resume his work. (This eventually led to the election of Cevdet Sunay as the president.) 
29 May – Beşiktaş won the championship of Turkish football league.
5 June – Turkish Senate  1/3 by elections 
28 June – 504 Turks in Erenköy enclave, Cyprus, sieged by Greek forces were evacuated.
8 July – President Cevdet Sunay pardons former president Celal Bayar.
19 August – The 6.8  Varto earthquake shook the Muş Province with a maximum Mercalli intensity of IX (Violent), killing at least 2,394 and injuring up to 1,500.
17 September – Unity Party was founded
8 December – 65 soldiers in Dumlu died because of an accident.

Births
16 May – Metin Şentürk, singer
28 June – Şenay Gürler, actress
20 June Fatma Şahin –  mayor of Gaziantep  and a former government minister 
16 July – Yıldız Tilbe, singer
14 August – Tuncay Özkan, journalist

Deaths
2 February Hacı Ömer Sabancı , a well known industrialist
6 February Abdurrahman Nafiz Gürman , a former chief of staff
14 February – Ahmet Esat Tomruk (İngiliz Kemal)  (aged 74), former secret agent
28 June – Fuat Köprülü former vice prime minister and academic
14 September – Cemal Gürsel, former president

Gallery

See also
 1965–66 1.Lig

References

 
Years of the 20th century in Turkey
1966 in Europe
Turkey
Turkey